Second Genesis may refer to:

 Second Genesis (novel), a 1986 science fiction novel by Donald Moffitt
 Second Genesis (album), a 1974 album by Wayne Shorter